R-16661 is an extremely toxic organophosphate insecticide. With an oral LD50 of 0.1 mg/kg in mice and rats, R-16661 is about 10 times more toxic than aldicarb, the most toxic carbamate insecticide.

See also
Aldicarb
Paraoxon

References

Organophosphate insecticides
Acetylcholinesterase inhibitors
Oxazolidines
Methyl esters
Phosphoramidothioates